Denis Istomin was the defending champion, but lost in the first round to Damir Džumhur.

Steve Johnson won the title defeating Pablo Cuevas in the final, 7–6(7–5), 7–5.

Seeds
All seeds receive a bye into the second round.

Draw

Finals

Top half

Section 1

Section 2

Bottom half

Section 3

Section 4

Qualifying

Seeds

Qualifiers

Qualifying draw

First qualifier

Second qualifier

Third qualifier

Fourth qualifier

References
 Main Draw
 Qualifying Draw

Nottingham Open - Singles
2016 Men's Singles